On the Line (lit. Voice) is a 2021 South Korean crime action film, directed by Kim Gok and Kim Sun for Sufilm Co. Ltd. Starring Byun Yo-han, Kim Mu-yeol, Kim Hee-won and Park Myung-hoon, the film revolves around Seo-joon, a victim of voice phishing, who penetrates the perpetrators' organization in China to recover the money. 

It was theatrically released on September 15, 2021, coinciding with Chuseok holidays. , it is the fourth highest-grossing Korean film of 2021, with gross of US$11.87 million and 1.42 million cumulative admissions.

Synopsis
Voice phishing is the use of telephony (often voice over IP telephony) to conduct phishing attacks.

A former detective Seo-joon (Byun Yo-han), now head of the field operations team at Busan construction site, along with his family and colleagues are victim of voice phishing. He tracks down the organisation and penetrates the call center in China. Surprised by the systemic approach and scale of voice phishing, he meets Pro Kwak (Kim Mu-yeol), the head of the planning. He knew that he has a herculean task ahead of him to recover the scammed money.

Cast
 Byun Yo-han as Seo Joon, voice phishing victim
 Kim Mu-yeol as Pro Kwak, voice phishing designer
 Kim Hee-won as Lee Kyu-ho, the team leader of the intelligent crime investigation team set up to eradicate the 'voice phishing' crime
 Park Myung-hoon as Director Cheon at the call center, the home of voice phishing
 Choi Byung-mo Chief Park
 Lee Joo-young as Kkang Chil, hacker
 Won Jin-ah as Mi Yeon, Seo Joon's wife
 Yoon Byung-hee

Production
On November 27, 2019 Byun Yo-han's agency Saram Entertainment confirmed his casting in the film. Kim Mu-yeol joined the cast in December 2019.

In May 2020, the film was wrapped up and work on post production began.

Release
The film was theatrically released on September 15, 2021, coinciding with Chuseok holidays. It clashed with The Miracle, which was also released on the same day.

Reception

Box office
The film was released on September 15, 2021 on 1296 screens. As per Korean Film Council (Kofic) integrated computer network, the film ranks first on the Korean box office for consecutive 2 weeks. It also surpassed 1 million cumulative audience on 15th day of its release.

 it is at 4th place among all the Korean films released in the year 2021, with gross of US$11.87 million and 1.42 million admissions.

Critical response
SPOTV News reporter Kim Hyun-rok, reviewing the film opined that Voice, a real crime action has been shown from perspective of both, the victims and the criminals. She said, "[the film] takes the world of voice phishing as one axis, and the pleasure of destroying it on one axis. It added cinematic fun to the taste of looking into the world of crime that I thought I knew but didn't know." She praised the action sequences of the film and actor Byun Yo-han, who as a former police officer and a victim "is in charge of 'real action' [and] dedicated action was added to the emotions that were pressed tightly." Kim also appreciated the "realistic map of voice phishing and capitalism", she concluded, "it [the voice phishing call centre home base and process] is drawn as if it can be grasped by hand, and the level of immersion is considerable."

Jeong Hwa of Star News reviewing the film opined that the film is  educative and informative. It has "a didactic character." Jeong concluded, "Voice is an infotainment movie that is faithful to the two purposes of lessons and vicarious satisfaction. What you suffer knowingly is because you dig into your hopes and fears."

References

External links
 
 
 
 

CJ Entertainment films
2020s Korean-language films
Films postponed due to the COVID-19 pandemic
2021 films
South Korean action thriller films
South Korean crime action films
South Korean crime thriller films
South Korean police films
2021 crime thriller films
South Korean films about revenge
Films about fraud
Films set in Busan
Films set in Seoul
Films set in Shenyang
Films set in Manila